The 1988 U.S. Figure Skating Championships took place between January 4 and 10, 1988 in Denver, Colorado. Medals were awarded in four colors: gold (first), silver (second), bronze (third), and pewter (fourth) in four disciplines – men's singles, ladies' singles, pair skating, and ice dancing – across three levels: senior, junior, and novice.

The event was one of the criteria used to select the U.S. teams for the 1988 Winter Olympics, as well as the 1988 World Championships.

Senior results

Men

Ladies

Pairs

Ice dancing

Junior results

Men

Ladies

Pairs

Ice dancing

Novice results

Men

Ladies

Pairs

Ice dancing

References

External links
 Ladies' results
 Pairs' results

U.S. Figure Skating Championships
United States Figure Skating Championships, 1988
United States Figure Skating Championships, 1988
U.S. Figure
January 1988 sports events in the United States